Sylvia Constance Ashton-Warner  (17 December 1908 – 28 April 1984) was a New Zealand novelist, non-fiction writer, poet, pianist and world figure in the teaching of children. Her ideas for a child-based or organic approach to the teaching of reading and writing, including key vocabulary techniques, have gained currency and are still used and debated internationally today.

Early life
Sylvia Ashton-Warner was born on December 17, 1908, in Stratford, New Zealand. She was the daughter of Francis Ashton Warner, a bookkeeper, and Margaret Maxwell, a schoolteacher 14 years his junior. Ashton-Warner was one of ten children. When her father’s health deteriorated, her mother became the sole bread winner, thus needing to take her younger children to school with her to sit in her classroom while she taught. The older children were left at home with their mostly bedridden father.

Career 
Ashton-Warner chose teaching as a career partly because it was familiar to her from childhood days spent in her mother’s classroom, and partly because it gave her a chance to teach her passions, art and music. She attended Wairarapa College in Masterton, 1926–1927 and Auckland Teachers' Training College, 1928–1931. She then worked in Horoera, Pipiriki, Waiomatatini and Omahu, in schools with all or predominantly Māori rolls for 24 years.

Over years of teaching classes of mainly Māori children, she gradually developed her ideas on child-based or organic literacy teaching and her key vocabulary techniques.  Articles about these were published first in the New Zealand journal existing at the time called Here and Now from 1952–55 and later in her book Teacher.

As a novelist, she produced several works mostly centred on strong female characters. Her best known, Spinster (1958), was made into the 1961 film Two Loves starring Shirley MacLaine.

Ashton-Warner was invited to the Aspen Community School in October 1970 and to present at the University of Colorado third annual reading conference the following June.  She held a six-month visiting professorship at Simon Fraser University in British Columbia in 1971.

Awards
Ashton-Warner won a number of awards. These include the New Zealand State Literary Funds' Scholarship in Letters in 1958. Her autobiography I Passed this Way (1979) won the New Zealand Book Award for Non-fiction in 1980 and she was awarded the Delta Kappa Gamma Society International Educator's Award in the same year. She was appointed a Member of the Order of the British Empire, for services to education and literature, in the 1982 Queen's Birthday Honours list.

Personal life 
As a young woman, Ashton Warner thought of becoming a pianist, practising some 5 hours a day for years before she turned to teaching. Ashton-Warner met Keith Dawson Henderson in her first year at Auckland Teachers’ Training College in 1928 when she was 19. They married in Wellington on August 23, 1931. Together they had three children: Jasmine, Elliot and Ashton. They worked together for many years, often with Henderson as headmaster and Ashton Warner as infant mistress. Employment of a married couple in the same school was only possible, at the time, in Māori schools. Ashton-Warner’s pupils called her Mrs. Henderson. Keith Henderson died on January 7, 1969, aged 60.

Death and legacy 
Ashton-Warner died on 28 April 1984 in Tauranga  with two of her children by her side. Her life story was adapted for the 1985 biographical film Sylvia, which was based on her work and writings.

The Faculty of Education library at the University of Auckland—the institution at which Ashton-Warner trained between 1928 and 1929— was named the Sylvia Ashton-Warner Library in 1987 and includes the Sylvia Ashton-Warner Collection.

Despite a somewhat troubled relationship between Ashton-Warner and New Zealand, the country has definitely claimed her for their own.

The Ashton School in the Dominican Republic was founded in 1998 and was named in honour of Ashton-Warner, whose teaching methods inspired the school.

Ashton Warner's ideas for a child-based or organic approach to the teaching of reading and writing, including her key vocabulary techniques, have gained currency and are still used and debated internationally today.

Other writers have used Ashton-Warner's ideas to spin off books of their own.

Her legacy has also survived in the Language Experience Approach (LEA), a literacy program used with success in the USA and based on the principle that the best way of teaching children to read is through their own words.

In August 2008, the University of Auckland held a conference to commemorate one hundred years since her birth. A number of papers which re-evaluated Ashton-Warner's place in and relationship with New Zealand were produced as a result. (See list below)

Earlier papers of Sylvia Ashton-Warner are held in the Howard Gotlieb Archival Research Center in Boston University. Her later papers are held in the Alexander Turnbull Library in Wellington. Further material collected by Ashton-Warner's biographer, Lynley Hood, is held in the Hocken Collections in Dunedin.

Quote 
"Pleasant words won't do. Respectable words won't do. They must be words organically tied up, organically born from the dynamic life itself. They must be words that are already part of a child's being."

Selected publications by Sylvia Ashton-Warner 
Spinster. London: Secker and Warburg, 1958; New York: Simon and Schuster, 1958.
Teacher. New York: Simon and Schuster, 1963.
Myself. New York: Simon and Schuster, 1966; London: Secker and Warburg 1967.
Three. New York: Knopf, 1970.
Spearpoint. New York: Knopf, 1972.
I Passed This Way. New York: Knopf, 1979; London: Virago, 1979.

Papers produced as a result of the 2008 conference 
 Middleton, Sue. 'Ashton-Warner, Sylvia Constance - Early life and marriage', from the Dictionary of New Zealand Biography. Te Ara - the Encyclopedia of New Zealand, updated 6-Dec-11  
 Middleton,  Sue. (2011), Putting Sylvia Ashton-Warner in her Place: History, Geographical  Theory and the New Education. Paedagogica Historica, First published on: February 24, 2011 (iFirst) DOI:10.1080/00309230.2010.534102, URL:http://dx.doi.org/10.1080/00309230.2010.534102.
 Jones, A. and Middleton, Sue. (2009). Introduction. In A. Jones and S. Middleton (Eds.), The kiss and the ghost: Sylvia Ashton-Warner and New Zealand. Wellington: NZCER Press (NZ edition) and Rotterdam and Taipei: Sense (Rest of the World edition), pp. 1–8 (Sense edition page numbering)
 Middleton, Sue. (2009). Sylvia’s place: Ashton-Warner as New Zealand educational theorist. In A. Jones and S. Middleton (Eds.), The kiss and the ghost: Sylvia Ashton-Warner and New Zealand.     Wellington: NZCER Press (NZ edition) and Rotterdam and Taipei: Sense (Rest of the World edition), pp. 35–50 (Sense edition page numbering).

External links

References

Further reading 
Durix, Carole. 'Literary autobiography or autobiographical literature? The work of Sylvia Ashton-Warner.' Ariel, 18:2 (1987): 3-12.
Durix. C. 'Sylvia Ashton-Warner: portrait of an artist as a woman.' World Literature Written in English, (1980): 104-110.
Durix, C. 'The Maori in Sylvia Ashton-Warner's fiction.’ Literary Half-Yearly, 20 (1979): 13-26.
Edgar, Suzanne. 'Sylvia Ashton-Warner.' Quadrant, 26:6 (1982): 58-61.
Else, Anne and Heather Roberts, eds. A Woman’s Life: Writing by Women about Female Experience in New Zealand. Auckland: Penguin, 1989.
Hood, Lynley. Sylvia! The Biography of Sylvia Ashton-Warner. Auckland: Viking, 1988.
 James, Judith G. and Nancy S. Thompson. 'Sylvia Ashton-Warner's lost novel of female friendship.' Phoebe, 5:2 (1993): 43-55.
McEldowney, Dennis. 'Sylvia Ashton-Warner: A Problem of Grounding.' Landfall, 91, 23:3 (September 1969): 230-245.
Stead, C. K. 'Sylvia Ashton-Warner: Living on the Grand.' In the Glass Case: Essays on New Zealand Literature. Auckland: Auckland University Press; Oxford University Press, 1981, pp. 51–66; revised and republished in Kin of Place: Essays on twenty New Zealand Writers. Auckland: Auckland University Press, 2002, pp. 99–111.
Thompson, N.S. 'Sylvia Ashton-Warner: Reclaiming Personal Meaning in Literacy Teaching' The English Journal, Vol. 89, No. 3, Our History, Ourselves (Jan., 2000), pp. 90–96 National Council of Teachers of English https://doi.org/10.2307/82210

External links

List of books and published material
Biographical entry from The Oxford Companion to New Zealand Literature

1908 births
1984 deaths
New Zealand educators
New Zealand Members of the Order of the British Empire
20th-century New Zealand writers
New Zealand women writers
People educated at Wellington Girls' College
People from Stratford, New Zealand